Homero Aldo Expósito (November 5, 1918 – September 23, 1987) was an Argentine poet and tango songwriter. He used to compose with his brother Virgilio Expósito, who was responsible for the music.

Biography 

He was born in Campana and grew up in the city of Zárate, a very important city in the development of the tango. The name Expósito stems from the fact that Homero's father had been an orphan and had decided to adopt this surname meaning of unknown origin. From a young age, Homero, along with his brother and the future famous drummer Tito Alberti, were part of an orchestra.

He took his secondary studies at the Colegio San José de Buenos Aires. He created his first tango with his brother in 1938 entitled Rodando and sung by Libertad Lamarque without repercussion instruments. In 1945 he moved to Buenos Aires. On the same level with his work as an author, he dedicated himself to the organization of Argentine musicians, SADAIC, for which he was treasurer for many years.

He composed tangos, not only with his brother Virgilio Expósito, but with famous musicians like Aníbal Troilo (Te llaman malevo), Domingo Federico (Percal, Yuyo verde, Tristezas de la calle Corrientes, Al compás del corazón), Armando Pontier (Trenzas), Enrique Mario Francini (Ese muchacho Troilo), Héctor Stamponi (Flor de lino), Osmar Maderna (Pequeña), Argentino Galván (Cafetín) and Atilio Stampone (Afiches).

Songs

Tangos 
 "Percal"
 "Naranjo en flor",
 "Margó"
 "Flor de lino"
 "Qué me van a hablar de amor"
 "Ese muchacho Troilo"
 "Te llaman Malevo"
 "A Bailar" with Domingo Federico

Pop songs 
 "Eso, Eso, Eso" 1960, sung by Los T.N.T.; one of the first Rock en Español hits.

See also 

 Argentine tango
 Pop

References

External links 
 
 
 Homero Expósito, Todo Tango

Tango poets
Argentine songwriters
Male songwriters
Argentine male poets
1918 births
1987 deaths
20th-century Argentine poets
20th-century Argentine writers
20th-century Argentine male writers
Burials at La Chacarita Cemetery
People from Zárate, Buenos Aires
20th-century male musicians